The 2020 United States House of Representatives election in North Dakota was held on November 3, 2020, to elect the U.S. representative from North Dakota's at-large congressional district. The election coincided with the 2020 U.S. presidential election, as well as other elections to the House of Representatives, elections to the United States Senate and various state and local elections.

The incumbent is Republican Kelly Armstrong, who was elected with 60.2% of the vote in 2018.

Republican primary

Candidates

Declared
Kelly Armstrong, incumbent U.S. Representative

Primary results

Democratic-NPL primary

Candidates

Declared
Zach Raknerud, retail manager and Democratic-NPL nominee for District 5 of the North Dakota House of Representatives in 2018
Roland Riemers, perennial candidate, winner of the 1996 North Dakota Democratic primary

Endorsements

Primary results

Libertarian primary

Candidates

Declared
Steven Peterson

Primary results

General election

Predictions

Results

References

External links
 
 
  (State affiliate of the U.S. League of Women Voters)
 

Official campaign websites
Kelly Armstrong (R) for Congress
Zach Raknerud (D) for Congress

2020
North Dakota
United States House of Representatives